Sribagh Pact is an agreement made between the political leaders of Coastal Andhra and Rayalaseema regions during the separate Andhra in 16 November 1937. Historically, the Sribagh Agreement has been an important subject matter to the people of Rayalaseema region, as far as developmental issues due to the attitude of the then Andhra leaders.

History and background 

Since the takeover of South India by the British in late 18th century, many Telugu speaking regions had been merged with Madras State.

Andhra University
The controversy over the headquarters of the Andhra University had created the differences between the people of Rayalaseema and coastal Circar districts.

Andhra University was inaugurated on 26 April 1926 with headquarters at Bezawada. But the question of the center and the location of the headquarters created problem. Soon after inauguration, the university syndicate sent a proposal to Madras government to have fourth center also at Bezawada. The department of education opposed it on financial grounds. University chosen to move a center from Rajahmundry to Bezawada. The people of Rajahmundry wanted headquarters in exchange. Amid the conflict between the two cities, Waltair was chosen as the headquarters of university in 1929.

At this stage, People of Rayalaseema, who were educationally more backward than the Circar districts, wanted that the headquarters of the University be situated in their region. Andhra Mahasabha  held in Anantapur in 1927 resolved that the headquarters of the University should be shifted to Anantapur.  The senate of the Andhra University resolved by 35 to 20 to make Anantapur the headquarters of the University.

The Madras government did not accept the recommendations of the committee or the senate of the University. The government not only shifted headquarters from Bezawada to Vizag, but also re-affiliated all existing colleges in Rayalaseema to the Madras University jurisdiction.

Rayalaseema Mahasabha
An organization known as Rayalaseema Mahasabha was formed in 1934 by Justices like C.L.Narasimha Reddy and K. Subrahmanyam to safeguard the interests of Rayalaseema and stay within Madras University jurisdiction.

The first session of the Rayalaseema Mahasabha was held at Madras on 28 January 1934. It was presided over by Nemali Pattabhirama Rao of Cuddapah. It was inaugurated by S. Satyamurti, a Tamil leader, who is against separate Andhra sentiment. The conference opposed the attempts made by the congress legislators of the coastal districts to extend the jurisdiction of the Andhra University over Rayalaseema and demanded the creation of Sri Venkateswara University at Tirupati. The second session of the conference was held at Cuddapah in the first week of September 1935. Important Congress leaders of Rayalaseema like K. Koti Reddi, G. Harisarvothama Rao and P. Ramachari did not attend any sessions.

The leaders of the Rayalaseema Mahasabha like C. L. Narasimha Reddy and Subrahmanyam were defeated by Congress candidates in 1937 Madras legislative assembly and council elections. The organisation failed to make political impact but continued to oppose the formation of Andhra province till the end.

Andhra Congress
The Congress party won the 1937 elections in Madras state under the leadership of C. Rajagopalachari. His cabinet included three people, Tanguturi Prakasam, Bezawada Gopala Reddy and V. V. Giri from coastal Andhra. His government consisted of 24 job with 10 ministers, 10 parliamentary secretaries, speaker and deputy secretary. None from Rayalaseema are considered. The Rayalaseema congress leaders felt that they were let down by the Circars leaders and insisted on the inclusion of the Rayalaseema representatives in the cabinet.

Soon after the elections, the Andhras intensified the movement for a separate Andhra province. Dr. Pattabhi Sitaramayya became the President of the Andhra Province Congress Committee in August 1937. G. Brahmayya, Bulusu Sambamurthy and other leaders increased their efforts to secure the province. The leaders of the Circars realized the need to enlist the co-operation of Rayalaseema in order to get the demand of separate Andhra province satisfied. But Rayalaseema leaders were not ready to go hand in hand with coastal leaders, as they had their own doubts of development of their region due to the attitude of andhra leaders in taking out the Andhra university and other reasons.

The Silver Jubilee session of the Andhra Mahasabha was held at Vijayawada in October 1937. It was inaugurated by Halaharvi Sitarama Reddi and presided over by Kadapa Koti Reddi, both congress legislators from Rayalaseema. They appealed to the Circar leaders to win back the confidence of Rayalaseema by providing safeguards to the region.

Sribagh Meeting

On 16 November 1937, the leaders of both the regions sat for an agreement in Sribagh, the house of Kashinathuni Nageshwara Rao, a well known media owner, founder of Andhra Patrika and of Amrutanjan. The committee discussed on the conditions to be fulfilled if Rayalaseema should co-operate with the Coastal districts in the demand for an Andhra Province. This agreement came to be known as the Sribagh pact or Sribagh Agreement.

Members

The agreement
This was an agreement for the development of Rayalaseema region at par with coastal areas and to bring in consensus among all the regions before formation of Andhra province.

The main points of the pact were:

 University: That two University Centers are to be developed under the Andhra University, one at Vizag and another at Anantapur so as to distribute the centers of culture over the Andhra province, and create opportunities for social and cultural intercourse amongst the Andhras and locate colleges in areas favorable to the subjects dealt with.
 Irrigation: The rapid development of the agricultural and economic interests of Rayalaseema and Nellore shall be done to the level of those in the Coastal districts. In respect of the utilization of the waters of Tungabhadra, Krishna and Pennar, ten year exclusive attention shall given in respect of major projects beneficial to Rayalaseema. Whenever the question of sharing waters arise, the needs of the Rayalaseema are to be first met.
 Legislature: That in the matter of general seats in the Legislature, the distribution shall be generally on an equal district basis. 
 Decentralization: The location of the University, the Headquarters and the High Court shall be in different regions. While the University may continue to be where it is, the High Court and Metropolis are to be located in suitable places in the Coastal districts and Rayalaseema and the choice shall be given to Rayalaseema.
 It shall, however, be open to vary these terms by common consent.

Results
At last, the Rayalaseema joined in the Andhra University. A memorandum was submitted to the Assembly of Madras regarding the separate Andhra province and was forwarded the Government of India on 21 April 1938. The Secretary of State for India declared that the Government was not interested to create any new state.

After the martyrdom of Potti Sreeramulu, the government of India agreed to form linguistic based states including Andhra state. Jawaharlal Nehru wanted the capital issue to be settled first before announcing the separate state for Andhras. A meeting of leaders of Andhra Area took place under the leadership of Tanguturi Prakasam at Madras. Gouthu Latchanna from Srikakulam proposed for location of capital at Tirupati in adherence to the Sribhah pact. The Communists proposed Vijayawada to Guntur area for location of the capital city. No consensus could be arrived and the final decision was left to the Tanguturi Prakasam who proposed Kurnool as the capital. The High Court got located at Guntur.

On October 1, 1953, new Andhra State was formed with Kurnool as the capital under the terms of the Sribagh pact.  After the formation of the Andhra Pradesh State in 1956, both the capital city and high court moved to Hyderabad, Telangana.

Gentlemen's Agreement

People may confuse the Sri Bagh and Gentleman's agreement. While Sri Bhag agreement is between Coastal Andhra and Rayalaseema leaders, the Gentlemen's Agreement is between Andhra and Telangana leaders. In 1956, when the states were reorganised based on language, Telugu speaking areas of Hyderabad state were proposed to merge with Andhra state. Hyderabad state leaders had apprehensions on these merger, so the Gentleman's Agreement was signed by state leaders of Hyderabad and Andhra states on Feb 20th 1956, at Hyderabad House in New Delhi under the scope of Prime Minister Jawaharlal Nehru to safeguard the rights of Telangana region.

References 

History of Andhra Pradesh
Reorganisation of Indian states
1937 in India
1937 documents